Stacey Waite is a poet—focusing on both slam and written verse—who also works as an Associate Professor of English at the University of Nebraska-Lincoln. Waite's poetry often explores themes of the body—of the intersections of gender, sexuality, place and relationships. She has published four collections of poetry over the past several years.

Career 
Waite attended her first live slam poetry performance in New York City as a teen. Since moving to Nebraska, Waite has worked as a teaching artist with the Nebraska Writers Collective and its slam-poetry program Louder Than A Bomb (LTAB). LTAB allows high school students from around the state of the Nebraska to write, practice, perform and compete in slam poetry bouts around the state.

Waite is currently working on a book about pedagogy and the teaching of writing that will be published in 2017 by the University of Pittsburgh Press, a project that aligns with Waite's role as a writing professor and her interest in the hows and whys of teaching writing and composition to first-year college students.

Reception 
A review in Lambda Literary praises how Waite's poetry in Butch Geography "demonstrates the centrality of gender in our lives; she explores the intimacy and uncertainty of gender." In a recent review, poet and Prairie Schooner editor Kwame Dawes called Waite "a pathfinder," who in Butch Geography in particular charts "with disarming honesty, humor, pathos, and willful perplexity the uncertain terrain of gender in ways that shatter assumptions, unsettle easy presumptions, and yet, through the sheer grace of craft ... open us to the beauty of our strange human enterprise."

Publications

Poetry 
Choke - winner of the 2004 Frank O'Hara prize 
Love Poem to Androgyny - chapbook, winner of the 2006 Main Street Rag Competition 
the lake has no saint - winner of the 2008 Snowbound Prize from Tupelo Press 
Butch Geography - published in 2013 by Tupelo Press

Other Works
Butch Defines Feminism Under the Following Conditions
The Kind of Man I Am At The DMV
Aunt Liz Whittles A Wooden Dollhouse

References

Slam poets